Noguchiphaea is a genus of broad-winged damselflies in the family Calopterygidae. There are at least three described species in Noguchiphaea.

Species
These three species belong to the genus Noguchiphaea:
 Noguchiphaea laotica Sasamoto, Yokoi & Souphanthong, 2019
 Noguchiphaea mattii Do, 2008
 Noguchiphaea yoshikoae Asahina, 1976

References

Further reading

 
 
 

Calopterygidae
Articles created by Qbugbot